Lezgistan or Lekia may refer to the following: 
a term occasionally applied to describe the present-day Kurdamir, before the Russian Revolution.
an irredentist concept by a Sadval separatist organisation which aims to create a unified ethno-political entity in the bordering Lezgin-inhabited areas of the Russian Republic of Dagestan and Azerbaijan.

Historical concept 
While ancient Greek historians, including Herodotus, Strabo, and Pliny the Elder, referred to Legoi people who inhabited Caucasian Albania, Arab historians of 9-10th centuries mention the kingdom of Lakz in present-day southern Dagestan. Al Masoudi referred to inhabitants of this area as Lakzams (Lezgins), who defended Shirvan against invaders from the north.

Prior to the Russian Revolution, "Lezgin" was a term applied to all ethnic groups inhabiting the present-day Russian Republic of Dagestan.

Political concept

The Lezgin National Movement, "Sadval" (Unity) was established in July 1990 in Derbent, Dagestan, Russia (then Soviet Union). They demanded the unification of the Lezgin people (in Azerbaijan and Dagestan) because they had been "denied the opportunity to develop their culture" under Soviet rule. 

Sadval did not find support ground in Azerbaijan, moreover, it was cited for the March 19, 1994 bomb attack in Baku subway during which 27 people were killed. There was evidence that Armenian Secret Service had participated in the creation of Sadval, provided funding, training and weapons to its militants.

See also 
 Lezgins in Azerbaijan
 Caucasian Albania
 Lezgin language
 Lezghin people

References

Lezgins
Separatism in Azerbaijan
Irredentism